Phytophthora (from Greek  (phytón), "plant" and , "destruction"; "the plant-destroyer") is a genus of plant-damaging oomycetes (water molds), whose member species are capable of causing enormous economic losses on crops worldwide, as well as environmental damage in natural ecosystems. The cell wall of Phytophthora is made up of cellulose. The genus was first described by Heinrich Anton de Bary in 1875.  Approximately 170 species have been described, although 100–500 undiscovered Phytophthora species are estimated to exist.

Pathogenicity

Phytophthora spp. are mostly pathogens of dicotyledons, and many are relatively host-specific parasites. Phytophthora cinnamomi, though, infects thousands of species ranging from  club mosses, ferns, cycads, conifers,  grasses, lilies, to members of many dicotyledonous families. Many species of Phytophthora are plant pathogens of considerable economic importance. Phytophthora infestans was the infective agent of the potato blight that caused the Great Famine of Ireland, and still remains the most destructive pathogen of solanaceous crops, including tomato and potato. The soya bean root and stem rot agent, Phytophthora sojae, has also caused longstanding problems for the agricultural industry. In general, plant diseases caused by this genus are difficult to control chemically, thus the growth of resistant cultivars is the main management strategy.
Other important Phytophthora diseases are:

 Phytophthora agathidicida—causes collar-rot on New Zealand kauri (Agathis australis), New Zealand's most voluminous tree, an otherwise successful survivor of the Jurassic
 Phytophthora cactorum—causes rhododendron root rot affecting rhododendrons, azaleas, and orchids, and causes bleeding canker in hardwood trees
 Phytophthora capsici—infects Cucurbitaceae fruits, such as cucumbers and squash
 Phytophthora cinnamomi—causes cinnamon root rot affecting forest and fruit trees, and woody ornamentals including arborvitaee, azalea, Chamaecyparis, dogwood, forsythia, Fraser fir, hemlock, Japanese holly, juniper, Pieris, rhododendron, Taxus, white pine, American chestnut and Australian woody plants, especially eucalypt and banksia.
 Phytophthora citricola—causes root rot and stem cankers in citrus trees
 Phytophthora fragariae—causes red root rot affecting strawberries
 Phytophthora infestans causes the serious disease known as potato (late) blight: responsible for the Great Famine of Ireland. 
 Phytophthora kernoviae—pathogen of beech and rhododendron, also occurring on other trees and shrubs including oak, and holm oak. First seen in Cornwall, UK, in 2003.
 Phytophthora lateralis—causes cedar root disease in Port Orford cedar trees
 Phytophthora megakarya—one of the cocoa black pod disease species, is invasive and probably responsible for the greatest cocoa crop loss in Africa
  Phytophthora multivora—discovered in analysis of isolates with P. cinnamomi dieback infections of tuart forests of Southwest Australia, which were previously diagnosed as P. citricola. The species was found occurring on many other taxa, so named multivora.
 Phytophthora nicotianae—infects tobacco and onions
 Phytophthora palmivora—causes fruit rot in coconuts and betel nuts
 Phytophthora ramorum—infects over 60 plant genera and over 100 host species; causes sudden oak death
 Phytophthora quercina—causes oak death
 Phytophthora sojae—causes soybean root rot

Research beginning in the 1990s has placed some of the responsibility for European forest die-back on the activity of imported Asian Phytophthoras.

In 2019, scientists in Connecticut were conducting experiments testing various methods to grow healthier Fraser trees when they accidentally discovered a new species of Phytophthora, which they called Phytophthora abietivora. The fact that these scientists so readily discovered a new species further suggests that there could be many more species waiting to be discovered.

Species
The NCBI lists:

Phytophthora acerina 
Phytophthora afrocarpa
Phytophthora agathidicida 
 Phytophthora aleatoriaScott P, Taylor P, Gardner J, Puértolas A, Panda P, Addison S, Hood I, Burgess T, Horner I, Williams N, and McDougal R. 2019. Phytophthora aleatoria sp. nov., associated with root and collar damage on Pinus radiata from nurseries and plantations. Australasian Plant Pathology, 48 (4): 313–321.
Phytophthora alni 
Phytophthora × alni 
 Phytophthora alpina  Bregant C, Sanna GP, Bottos A, Maddau L, Montecchio L, Linaldeddu BT. 2020.Diversity and pathogenicity of Phytophthora species associated with declining alder trees in Italy and description of Phytophthora alpina sp. nov. Forests 11 (8): 848
Phytophthora alticola 
Phytophthora amaranthi 
Phytophthora amnicola 
Phytophthora amnicola × moyootj 
Phytophthora xandina 
Phytophthora aquimorbida 
Phytophthora arecae 
Phytophthora arenaria 
Phytophthora cf. arenaria 
Phytophthora aff. arenaria 
Phytophthora asiatica 
Phytophthora asparagi 
Phytophthora aff. asparagi 
Phytophthora attenuata 
Phytophthora austrocedrae 
Phytophthora balyanboodja 
Phytophthora batemanensis syn. Halophytophthora batemanensis 
Phytophthora bilorbang 
Phytophthora bisheria 
Phytophthora bishii 
Phytophthora boehmeriae 
Phytophthora boodjera 
Phytophthora borealis 
Phytophthora botryosa 
Phytophthora cf. botryosa 
Phytophthora aff. botryosa 
Phytophthora brassicae 
Phytophthora cactorum 
Phytophthora cactorum var. applanata 
Phytophthora cactorum × hedraiandra 
Phytophthora cajani 
Phytophthora × cambivora 
Phytophthora capensis 
Phytophthora capsici 
Phytophthora aff. capsici 
Phytophthora captiosa 
Phytophthora castaneae 
Phytophthora castanetorum 
Phytophthora chesapeakensis 
Phytophthora chlamydospora 
Phytophthora chrysanthemi 
Phytophthora cichorii 
Phytophthora aff. cichorii 
Phytophthora cinnamomi 
Phytophthora cinnamomi var. cinnamomi 
Phytophthora cinnamomi var. parvispora 
Phytophthora cinnamomi var. robiniae 
Phytophthora citricola 
Phytophthora aff. citricola 
Phytophthora citrophthora 
Phytophthora citrophthora var. clementina 
Phytophthora aff. citrophthora 
Phytophthora clandestina 
Phytophthora cocois 
Phytophthora colocasiae 
Phytophthora condilina 
Phytophthora constricta 
Phytophthora cooljarloo 
Phytophthora crassamura 
Phytophthora cryptogea 
Phytophthora aff. cryptogea 
Phytophthora cuyabensis 
Phytophthora cyperi 
Phytophthora dauci 
Phytophthora aff. dauci 
Phytophthora drechsleri 
Phytophthora drechsleri var. cajani 
Phytophthora elongata 
Phytophthora cf. elongata 
Phytophthora erythroseptica 
Phytophthora erythroseptica var. pisi 
Phytophthora aff. erythroseptica 
Phytophthora estuarina 
Phytophthora europaea 
Phytophthora fallax 
Phytophthora flexuosa 
Phytophthora fluvialis 
Phytophthora fluvialis × moyootj 
Phytophthora foliorum 
Phytophthora formosa 
Phytophthora formosana 
Phytophthora fragariae 
Phytophthora fragariaefolia 
Phytophthora frigida 
Phytophthora gallica 
Phytophthora gemini 
Phytophthora gibbosa 
Phytophthora glovera 
Phytophthora gonapodyides 
Phytophthora gondwanensis 
Phytophthora gregata 
Phytophthora cf. gregata 
Phytophthora hedraiandra 
Phytophthora aff. hedraiandra 
Phytophthora × heterohybrida 
Phytophthora heveae 
Phytophthora hibernalis 
Phytophthora himalayensis 
Phytophthora himalsilva 
Phytophthora aff. himalsilva 
Phytophthora humicola 
Phytophthora aff. humicola 
Phytophthora hydrogena 
Phytophthora hydropathica 
Phytophthora idaei 
Phytophthora ilicis 
Phytophthora × incrassata 
Phytophthora infestans 
Phytophthora aff. infestans 
Phytophthora inflata 
Phytophthora insolita 
Phytophthora cf. insolita 
Phytophthora intercalaris 
Phytophthora intricata 
Phytophthora inundata 
Phytophthora ipomoeae 
Phytophthora iranica 
Phytophthora irrigata 
Phytophthora katsurae 
Phytophthora kelmania 
Phytophthora kernoviae 
Phytophthora kwongonina 
Phytophthora lactucae 
Phytophthora lacustris 
Phytophthora lacustris × riparia 
Phytophthora lateralis 
Phytophthora lilii 
Phytophthora litchii 
Phytophthora litoralis 
Phytophthora litoralis × moyootj 
Phytophthora macilentosa 
Phytophthora macrochlamydospora 
Phytophthora meadii 
Phytophthora aff. meadii 
Phytophthora medicaginis 
Phytophthora medicaginis × cryptogea 
Phytophthora mediterranea
Phytophthora megakarya 
Phytophthora megasperma 
Phytophthora melonis 
Phytophthora mengei 
Phytophthora mexicana 
Phytophthora cf. mexicana 
Phytophthora mirabilis 
Phytophthora mississippiae 
Phytophthora morindae 
Phytophthora moyootj 
Phytophthora moyootj × fluvialis 
Phytophthora moyootj × litoralis 
Phytophthora moyootj × thermophila 
Phytophthora × multiformis 
Phytophthora multivesiculata 
Phytophthora multivora 
Phytophthora nagaii 
Phytophthora nemorosa 
Phytophthora nicotianae 
Phytophthora nicotianae var. parasitica 
Phytophthora nicotianae × cactorum 
Phytophthora niederhauserii 
Phytophthora cf. niederhauserii 
Phytophthora obscura 
Phytophthora occultans 
Phytophthora oleae 
Phytophthora ornamentata 
Phytophthora pachypleura 
Phytophthora palmivora 
Phytophthora palmivora var. palmivora 
Phytophthora parasitica 
Phytophthora parasitica var. nicotianae 
Phytophthora parasitica var. piperina 
Phytophthora parsiana 
Phytophthora aff. parsiana 
Phytophthora parvispora 
Phytophthora × pelgrandis 
Phytophthora phaseoli 
Phytophthora pini 
Phytophthora pinifolia 
Phytophthora pisi 
Phytophthora pistaciae 
Phytophthora plurivora 
Phytophthora pluvialis 
Phytophthora polonica 
Phytophthora porri 
Phytophthora primulae 
Phytophthora aff. primulae 
Phytophthora pseudocryptogea 
Phytophthora pseudolactucae 
Phytophthora pseudorosacearum 
Phytophthora pseudosyringae 
Phytophthora pseudotsugae 
Phytophthora aff. pseudotsugae 
Phytophthora psychrophila 
Phytophthora quercetorum 
Phytophthora quercina 
Phytophthora quininea 
Phytophthora ramorum 
Phytophthora rhizophorae 
Phytophthora richardiae 
Phytophthora riparia 
Phytophthora rosacearum 
Phytophthora aff. rosacearum 
Phytophthora rubi 
Phytophthora sansomea 
Phytophthora sansomeana 
Phytophthora aff. sansomeana 
Phytophthora × serendipita 
Phytophthora sinensis 
Phytophthora siskiyouensis 
Phytophthora sojae 
Phytophthora stricta 
Phytophthora sulawesiensis 
Phytophthora syringae 
Phytophthora tabaci 
Phytophthora tentaculata 
Phytophthora terminalis 
Phytophthora thermophila 
Phytophthora thermophila × amnicola 
Phytophthora thermophila × moyootj 
Phytophthora tonkinensis
Phytophthora trifolii 
Phytophthora tropicalis 
Phytophthora cf. tropicalis 
Phytophthora tubulina 
Phytophthora tyrrhenica 
Phytophthora uliginosa 
Phytophthora undulata 
Phytophthora uniformis 
Phytophthora vignae 
Phytophthora vignae f. sp. adzukicola 
Phytophthora virginiana 
Phytophthora vulcanica

Resemblance to fungi 
Phytophthora is sometimes referred to as a fungus-like organism, but it is classified under a different clade altogether: SAR supergroup (Harosa) (also under Stramenopila and previously under Chromista). This is a good example of convergent evolution: Phytophthora is morphologically very similar to true fungi yet its evolutionary history is completely distinct. In contrast to fungi, SAR supergroup is more closely related to plants than to animals. Whereas fungal cell walls are made primarily of chitin, Phytophthora cell walls are constructed mostly of cellulose. Ploidy levels are different between these two groups; Phytophthora species have diploid (paired) chromosomes in the vegetative (growing, nonreproductive) stage of life, whereas fungi are almost always haploid in this stage. Biochemical pathways also differ, notably the highly conserved lysine synthesis path.

Biology
Phytophthora species may reproduce sexually or asexually. In many species, sexual structures have never been observed, or have only been observed in laboratory matings. In homothallic species, sexual structures occur in single culture.  Heterothallic species have mating strains, designated as A1 and A2. When mated, antheridia introduce gametes into oogonia, either by the oogonium passing through the antheridium (amphigyny) or by the antheridium attaching to the proximal (lower) half of the oogonium (paragyny), and the union producing oospores.  Like animals, but not like most true fungi, meiosis is gametic, and somatic nuclei are diploid.
Asexual (mitotic) spore types are chlamydospores, and sporangia which produce zoospores.  Chlamydospores are usually spherical and pigmented, and may have a thickened cell wall to aid in their role as a survival structure.  Sporangia may be retained by the subtending hyphae (noncaducous) or be shed readily by wind or water tension (caducous) acting as dispersal structures.  Also, sporangia may release zoospores, which have two unlike flagella which they use to swim towards a host plant.

Zoospores (and zoospores of Pythium, also in the Peronosporales) recognize not only hosts but particular locations on hosts. Phytophthora zoospores recognize and attach to specific root surface regions. This is a high degree of specificity at an early stage of cell development.

References

Further reading
 Lucas, J.A. et al. (eds.) (1991) Phytophthora based on a symposium held at Trinity College, Dublin, Ireland September 1989. British Mycological Society, Cambridge University Press, Cambridge, UK, ;
 Erwin, Donald C. and Ribeiro, Olaf K. (1996) Phytophthora Diseases Worldwide American Phytopathological Society Press, St. Paul, Minnesota, 
 Erwin, Donald C. (1983) Phytophthora: its biology, taxonomy, ecology, and pathology American Phytopathological Society Press, St. Paul, Minnesota, 
 "APHIS List of Regulated Hosts and Plants Associated with Phytophthora ramorum" U.S. Animal and Plant Health Inspection Services
 "Dieback" Department of Environment and Conservation, Western Australia

External links
 Goodwin, Stephen B. (January 2001) "Phytophthora Bibliography" Purdue University
 Abbey, Tim (2005) "Phytophthora Dieback and Root Rot" College of Agriculture and Natural Resources, University of Connecticut
 "Phytophthora Canker – Identification, Biology and Management" Bartlett Tree Experts Online Resource Library
 "Phytophthora Root Rot – Identification, Biology and Management" Bartlett Tree Experts Online Resource Library
 Dieback Working Group – Western Australia

 
Water mould plant pathogens and diseases
Water mould genera